Adam Fergus is an Irish actor.

Early life
Born in Drogheda, County Louth and raised in the nearby village of Laytown, he is the son of a nurse and a recruitment specialist. He attended Clongowes College before going to University College Dublin, and was part of the 'Dramsoc' (Imperial College Dramatic Society). He achieved an honours degree. He then attended the Gaiety School of Acting, Dublin in 2003.

Career
His film and television credits include roles in the television series Proof, The Clinic, Trouble in Paradise and Clean Break, and the films Inside I'm Dancing, Happy Ever Afters, Satellites and Meteorites, and The F Word. He had a starring role as an Irish Canadian in the Canadian comedy-drama series Being Erica. Adam began appearing on the CW series Supernatural in its twelfth season as Mick Davies, a member of the British Men of Letters.

His stage roles have included productions of Les Liaisons Dangereuses at the Gate Theatre, Dublin, The Home Place, A Midsummer Night's Dream, Great Expectations, Kilt and The Illusion.

Personal life
Adam married American actress Hayley Erin in 2020, after announcing their relationship in 2019. They have twin girls together born in 2021.

Filmography

Grey's Anatomy

References

External links

Irish male film actors
Irish male television actors
Irish male stage actors
People from Drogheda
Living people
People from County Meath
21st-century Irish male actors
Year of birth missing (living people)